Gamma Delphini, which is Latinized from γ Delphini, is a wide binary star system in the northern constellation of Delphinus. The star marks one corner of the asterism "Job's Coffin". The pair can be split with a modest amateur telescope and have been described as "one of the prettier pairs in the sky", with their contrasting colors said to be orange and lime in appearance. Together, the system is visible to the naked eye with a combined apparent visual magnitude of 3.87.

Space motion
The system is located at a distance of 115 light years from the Sun based on parallax, but is drifting closer with a radial velocity of −7 km/s. It is a member of the thin disk population, and is a proposed member of the Wolf 630 moving group.

This star was found to be a double by Christian Mayer and later observed by William Herschel on Sept 27th, 1779. It was later included as STF 2727 in the catalogue compiled by F. G. W. Struve and can be found under this name in the Washington Double Star Catalog. At the time, the components had an angular separation of  along a position angle (PA) of 280°. The fainter component, designated γ1 Delphini, is of apparent magnitude 5.03. Its companion is a magnitude 4.360 star designated γ2 Delphini. A fit of orbital elements to the available positional data provides a period of 3,249 years with a high eccentricity (ovalness) of 0.88.

Physical properties
The stellar classification of γ1 Delphini is F7V, which matches an F-type main-sequence star with a yellow-white hue. It is about 1.8 billion years old and is spinning with a projected rotational velocity of 7.8 km/s. The star has 1.6 times the mass and 2.6 times the radius of the Sun. It is radiating 10 times the Sun's luminosity from its photosphere at an effective temperature of 6,295 K.

The brighter component, γ2 Delphini, has an orange hue with a class of K1IV. Being the more massive star of the pair, it is the more evolved star and is currently on the subgiant branch. It has double the mass of the Sun but has expanded to over eight times the Sun's radius. The star is radiating 33 times the luminosity of the Sun at 4,798 K. It is spinning with a projected rotational velocity of 3.6 km/s. The star displays a radial acceleration with a periodicity of 1.44 years, which may be the effect of an orbiting companion.

The system is a source of X-ray emission with high probability.

Possible planetary system
In 1999, the presence of a planetary companion was inferred around Gamma2 Delphini as one possible explanation for the radial velocity variations. Such a planet would have a minimum mass of 0.7 Jupiter masses, orbital period of 1.44 years and separation of nearly 1.5 astronomical units (almost the orbital separation of Mars from the Sun). The planetary candidate has not been confirmed. McDonald Observatory researches have set mass limits for potential planetary companions in orbit around the star Gamma2 Delphini.

References

External links 
 

F-type main-sequence stars
K-type subgiants
Hypothetical planetary systems
Binary stars

Delphinus (constellation)
Delphini, Gamma
BD+15 4255
Delphini, 12
197963 4
102531/2
7947/8